Fiji competed at the 2020 Summer Olympics in Tokyo. Originally scheduled to take place from 24 July to 9 August 2020, the Games were postponed to 23 July to 8 August 2021, because of the COVID-19 pandemic. Since the nation's debut in 1956, Fijian athletes have taken part in every edition of the Summer Olympic Games, except for two occasions. Fiji failed to register any athletes at the 1964 Summer Olympics in Tokyo, and joined the American-led boycott when Moscow hosted the 1980 Summer Olympics.

Medalists

Competitors
The following is the list of number of competitors in the Games.

Athletics

Fiji received a universality slot from the World Athletics to send a male track and field athlete to the Olympics.

Track & road events

Judo

Fiji entered one male judoka into the Olympic tournament based on the International Judo Federation Olympics Individual Ranking.

Rugby sevens

Summary

Men's tournament

The Fiji national rugby sevens team qualified for the Olympics by advancing to the quarterfinals in the 2019 London Sevens, securing a top four spot in the 2018–19 World Rugby Sevens Series.

Team roster

Group play

Quarterfinal

Semifinal

Gold medal match

Women's tournament

The Fiji women's national rugby sevens team qualified for the Olympics by winning the gold medal and securing an outright berth at the 2019 Oceania Women's Sevens Championships in Suva.

Team roster

Group play

Quarterfinal

Semifinal

Bronze medal match

Sailing

Fijian sailors qualified one boat in each of the following classes through the class-associated World Championships, and the continental regattas, marking the country's recurrence to the sport for the first time in two decades.

M = Medal race; EL = Eliminated – did not advance into the medal race

Swimming

Fiji qualified two swimmers in two events.

Table tennis

Fiji entered one athlete into the table tennis competition at the Games. With the cancellation of the 2021 Oceania Qualification Tournament, Rio 2016 Olympian Sally Yee accepted an invitation to compete in the women's singles for the second time, as the highest-ranked table tennis player vying for qualification from Oceania in the ITTF World Olympic Rankings of May 1, 2021.

References

Olympics
2020
Nations at the 2020 Summer Olympics